During the Mongol invasions of Vietnam the Trần dynasty (1225–1400) successful employed military tactics and strategies including scorched earth and hit and run tactics designed to take advantage of terrain.

Organization
The Royal Vietnamese army had a military force of up to 100,000 soldiers in 1281.

Army

 Cấm quân (Royal army): about 20,000
 Lộ quân (Local army): about 80,000

Cấm quân 
Cấm quân was the force guarding the city of Thăng Long, the capital of Đại Việt. Below are a list of Cấm quân:
 Thiên Thuộc
 Thiên Cương
 Chương Thánh
 Củng Thần
 Thánh Dực
 Thần Sách

Lộ quân 
Lộ quân was the force protecting the "Lộ" (administrative divisions in the Trần dynasty period). Every "Lộ" had one Quân and 20 support units called "Phong đoàn", of about 120 soldiers. Below are a list of Lộ quân:
 Thiên Trường
 Long Hưng
 Quốc Oai
 Bắc Giang
 Hải Đông
 Trường Yên
 Kiến Xương
 Hồng
 Khoái
 Thanh Hóa
 Hoàng Giang
 Diễn Châu

Navy

During the interwar periods, the Royal Vietnamese Navy consisted of two divisions:

 Đông Hải Quân (Eastern navy) consisted of 2,400 sailors who fought at sea, on rivers, and on beaches.
 Bình Hải Quân consisted of a "Quân", supported by 900 sailors on 30 sailboats, who fought at sea, on islands and at river mouths. Its headquarters was located on the island of Vân Đồn.

The total number of Trần naval vessels is uncertain. However, figures from the Battle of Vạn Kiếp (11 February 1285) hint at a sizeable fleet, as the Vietnamese navy maintained over 1,000 medium-sized river sailboats.

Other forces
 Sương quân was an army of a rich family or of the sovereign, personally, but not of the Trần royal dynasty.
 Vương hầu quân was an army recruited by royal nobles, who trained and equipped it themselves. According to royal law, there could have been about 1,000 of them. Their forces were rather important in war when the Mongols invaded Đại Việt.

Military policy

An important military policy of the Trần dynasty was "Ngụ binh ư nông" (Hán văn: 寓兵於農). When the nation was at peace, the royal house did not need more soldiers. Part of the military force was maintained permanently; otherwise, almost every man of military age was able to work his farm. Changes required to meet military needs were fulfilled by occasional or part-time service. When the nation was under threat of invasion, however, the emperor was able to call on all of the available manpower.

In 1284, the Trần dynasty forces consisted of 200,000 soldiers in anticipation of a Mongol invasion.

Strategy

The Trần continued and passed on proven Vietnamese military traditions, such as asymmetry, elusive face-to-face combat and enemy attrition. The actual combatants received the full support of the entire national population. Resilience and sheer perseverance eventually triumphed over their opponents' short-lived achievements. Usually Vietnam lost most battles but won each of the wars.

People's war 
When Đại Việt was under attack by the Mongols, everyone joined in the war: the threat of invasion called forth the spirit of solidarity and psychological self-defense as expressed in the Vietnamese slogan: "Cử quốc nghênh địch" ("The whole country face to face with the enemy").

At the Diên Hồng conference, when the Đại Việt emperor asked: "Should we surrender or fight?", the unanimous response of all members of Trần royalty, military commanders and senior counsellors was: "Fight!".

Soldiers of the Trần dynasty tattooed two words in Hán văn on their hands 殺韃. In modern Vietnamese this is: "Sát Thát" (meaning: "Kill Mongolians").

Scorched earth

Thăng Long, capital of Đại Việt, collapsed every time the Mongolians came, but they did not know that the Vietnamese were psychologically prepared to abandon Thăng Long on short notice, as they realized early on that they could not protect it. Instead, the Vietnamese adopted a scorched earth strategy, carrying away what they could, and destroying everything else, so that nothing of use remained for the invading Mongolian troops. This strategy was called in Vietnamese: "Vườn không nhà trống" ("Both garden and house are empty").

Longdays war
The favorite tactic of the Vietnamese was to prolong war, causing the Mongolian enemy to become bogged down in the rainy season. This resulted in the Mongolians becoming infected with tropical diseases, and to deplete their war resources, as in the Vietnamese expression: "Lấy sức nhàn thắng sức mỏi" ("Our troops in good health smite the tired enemy troops").

Tactics

Advantage of terrain, hit and run, and ambushes
From the beginning of the war, the Vietnamese military did not stop the Mongols, but let their army move deep into Đại Việt territory. They made use of their understanding of their territory, the advantages of terrain. They built secret bases to hide in, and ambush points where they fought. With this advantage, Vietnamese attack and defense were very flexible. The Mongols used hit and run tactics, but the Vietnamese were even more proficient at this tactic and made it into an art. When they could not win, they quickly withdrew.

In the Battle of Bạch Đằng, the Vietnamese used hit and run tactics, lured Mongol battleships into ambush on Bạch Đằng river, and defeated them.

Attack enemy logistics

The Vietnamese continually attacked the enemy military logistics. They understood that with huge numbers in their army, 500,000 soldiers and support personnel), the Mongols had substantial logistical needs. They repeatedly attacked Mongol supply lines. When they could not succeed, they chose to attack the Mongol reserve trains at a later time. In this way, when the logistics failed, the resources of the large Mongolian army would be exhausted.

The third time the Mongols invaded Đại Việt, they used 70 transport ships, and brought 170,000 koku of provender with them. The Vietnamese guessed that the Mongols sought to wage war without logistics problems. The Vietnamese army and navy awaited the arrival of the Mongols, and a naval battle occurred, in which the transport ships were almost all sunk. The Mongols quickly retreated from Đại Việt, knowing they could not wage war without food.

Counter-offensive

The Vietnamese forces frequently launched counter-offensives against the Mongols.

List of wars and battles

Wars with the Mongols

Mongol-Vietnamese War
Naval battle:
Battle of Vân Đồn (11 February 1285)
Battle of Bình Than (14 February 1285)
Battle of Bạch Đằng (1288)

War with Champa

Cham-Vietnamese War (1367–1390)
Battle of Vijaya 1377

Civil war

Coup d'état of Hồ Quý Ly

See also
Hịch tướng sĩ
Ming invasion of Đại Ngu

Notes

References 
(In Vietnamese) Phan Huy Chú, Lịch triều hiến chương loại chí, Book IV, Binh chế chí.
(In Vietnamese) 
(In Vietnamese) 
(In Vietnamese) 

 

History of Vietnam
History of Southeast Asia
History of Asia
Mongols
Trần dynasty